SOVA may refer to one of the following:

KIAC School of Visual Arts, a Canadian art school whose acronym is SOVA
Slovenska Obveščevalno-Varnostna Agencija, the Slovenian Intelligence and Security Agency, the central government intelligence agency in Slovenia
Soft output Viterbi algorithm, a variant of the Viterbi algorithm
SOVA, a solar monitor used on the 1992 European Retrievable Carrier (EURECA) satellite
SOVA Center, a human rights NGO in Russia

See also
Sova (disambiguation)